Asklepia is a genus of beetle in the family Carabidae first described by Max Liebke in 1938.

Species 
Asklepia contains the following twenty-seven species:

 Asklepia adisi Erwin & Zamorano, 2014
 Asklepia asuncionensis Erwin & Zamorano, 2014
 Asklepia biolat Erwin & Zamorano, 2014
 Asklepia bracheia Zamorano & Erwin, 2014
 Asklepia campbellorum Zamorano & Erwin, 2014
 Asklepia cuiabaensis Erwin & Zamorano, 2014
 Asklepia demiti Erwin & Zamorano, 2014
 Asklepia duofos Zamorano & Erwin, 2014
 Asklepia ecuadoriana Erwin & Zamorano, 2014
 Asklepia geminata (Bates, 1871)
 Asklepia grammechrysea Zamorano & Erwin, 2014
 Asklepia hilaris (Bates, 1871)
 Asklepia kathleenae Erwin & Zamorano, 2014
 Asklepia laetitia Zamorano & Erwin, 2014
 Asklepia lebioides (Bates, 1871)
 Asklepia macrops Erwin & Zamorano, 2014
 Asklepia marchantaria Erwin & Zamorano, 2014
 Asklepia marituba Zamorano & Erwin, 2014
 Asklepia matomena Zamorano & Erwin, 2014
 Asklepia pakitza Erwin & Zamorano, 2014
 Asklepia paraguayensis Zamorano & Erwin, 2014
 Asklepia pulchripennis (Bates, 1871)
 Asklepia samiriaensis Zamorano & Erwin, 2014
 Asklepia stalametlitos Zamorano & Erwin, 2014
 Asklepia strandi Liebke, 1938
 Asklepia surinamensis Zamorano & Erwin, 2014
 Asklepia vigilante Erwin & Zamorano, 2014

References

Lebiinae